David Delmar Edler (born August 5, 1956) is a former Major League Baseball player, Yakima city council member from 2003 to 2006, and ceremonial mayor of Yakima, Washington from 2006 to 2010. Edler played third base for the Seattle Mariners from -.

Edler attended Washington State University, where he played college baseball for the Cougars from 1976–1978.

References

External links
, or Retrosheet, or Pura Pelota (Venezuelan Winter League)
City of Yakima - Dave Edler Biography

1956 births
Living people
American athlete-politicians
Baseball players from Iowa
Bellingham Mariners players
Major League Baseball first basemen
Major League Baseball third basemen
Navegantes del Magallanes players
American expatriate baseball players in Venezuela
Omaha Royals players
Salt Lake City Gulls players
San Jose Missions players
Seattle Mariners players
Spokane Indians players
Sportspeople from Sioux City, Iowa
Mayors of places in Washington (state)
Washington (state) city council members
Washington State Cougars baseball players
Sportspeople from Yakima, Washington
Alaska Goldpanners of Fairbanks players